Deh Abbas Rural District is in the Central District of Eslamshahr County, Tehran province, Iran. At the National Census of 2006, its population was 22,826 in 5,635 households. There were 22,894 inhabitants in 6,214 households at the following census of 2011. At the most recent census of 2016, the population of the rural district was 7,625 in 2,153 households. The largest of its nine villages was Hoseynabad, with 3,899 people.

References 

Eslamshahr County

Rural Districts of Tehran Province

Populated places in Tehran Province

Populated places in Eslamshahr County